Gabriel Ignatius "Gab" J. Chee Kee (born July 30, 1976) is a Filipino guitarist, singer,  songwriter and one of the founding members of Filipino band Parokya ni Edgar.

Biography
Chee Kee, whose parents are both former teachers, is one of the four members of Parokya ni Edgar who attended Ateneo de Manila University during their grade school to high school years. In 2003, Chee Kee married his then girlfriend and former FHM Philippines model Apple Umali. They separated sometime in 2010.

Chee Kee is also famously known for composing and singing lead vocals in Parokya ni Edgar's sleeper hit song entitled "Your Song (My One and Only You)" which is a part of their album Bigotilyos track listing.

Discography

With Parokya ni Edgar 
 Khangkhungkherrnitz (1996)
 Buruguduystunstugudunstuy (1997)
 Jingle Balls Silent Night Holy Cow (1998)
 Gulong Itlog Gulong (1999)
 Edgar Edgar Musikahan (2002)
 Bigotilyo (2003)
 Halina Sa Parokya (2005)
 Solid (2007)
 Middle-Aged Juvenile Novelty Pop Rockers (2010)
 Pogi Years Old (2016)
 Borbolen (2021)

Compositions  
 Sampip
 Lazy
 Swimming Beach
 Superstar
 Y?
 It's Ok
 Absorbing Man
 Tsaka Na Lang
 Sad Trip
 Your Song
 Halina Sa Parokya
 Victor Could
 Nandito
 Don't Think
 Sing

As a featured artist
 "Baon" with Gloc-9

References 

1976 births
Ateneo de Manila University alumni
21st-century Filipino male singers
20th-century Filipino male singers
Musicians from Manila
Singers from Manila
Living people